Hillia Kobblah  (born 7 July 1991) is a Ghanaian footballer who plays as a midfielder for the Ghana women's national football team. She was part of the team at the 2014 African Women's Championship and at the 2015 African Games where she scored against Cameroon. At the club level, she played for Faith Ladies in Ghana.

International goals

References

1991 births
Living people
Ghanaian women's footballers
Ghana women's international footballers
Place of birth missing (living people)
Women's association football midfielders
Faith Ladies F.C. players